Prison Without Bars is a 1938 British black-and-white crime film directed by Brian Desmond Hurst and starring Corinne Luchaire, Edna Best and Barry K. Barnes. It is set in a girl's reform school, and was based on a play by Gina Kaus, previously filmed in France as Prison sans Barreaux (1938). Corinne Luchaire starred in both versions.

Synopsis
A young progressive thinking woman becomes superintendent at a French girl's reformatory dominated by the harsh previous head. A young girl is blackmailed by her acquaintance over her love for the superintendent's fiancé, but is released to join him in the end, when all is revealed.

Cast
Suzanne Duplat	- Corinne Luchaire
Yvonne Chanel - 	Edna Best
Dr George Marechal - 	Barry K. Barnes
Renee - 	Mary Morris
Alice - 	Lorraine Clewes
Julie Picard - 	Sally Wisher
Mme Appel - 	Martita Hunt
Mlle Arthemise - 	Margaret Yarde
Mme Remy - 	Elsie Shelton
Nina - 	Glynis Johns
Mlle Renard - 	Enid Lindsey
Mlle Pauline - 	Phyllis Morris 
Mlle Dupont - 	Nancy Roberts

Critical reception
In The New York Times, Frank S. Nugent dismissed the film as "another prison picture, and while we would not want to pass too harsh a sentence upon it, neither can we fairly pretend that it is innocent": whereas, in December 1938, The Daily Telegraph selected it as one of their ten best films of the year.

References

External links
 
 
 
 Prison Without Bars at the website dedicated to Brian Desmond Hurst

1938 films
1938 crime drama films
1938 romantic drama films
British prison drama films
British romantic drama films
British black-and-white films
Films produced by Alexander Korda
Films directed by Brian Desmond Hurst
British multilingual films
1938 multilingual films
1930s prison films
1930s English-language films
1930s British films